Stingray DJAZZ is a Dutch cultural music channel aimed at the European market which launched as DJAZZ.TV on 22 June 2012. The programming consists of jazz, soul, gospel, blues and world music, like reggae, tango and Brazilian music. The productions consist of jazz festivals, jazz concerts and documentaries. The channel was founded by Rob Overman and Robert Rutten. Since 31 July 2015 the channel is owned and operated by the Canadian company Stingray Group. In October 2016 it changed its name into Stingray DJAZZ.

Former Logo

See also
 Stingray Brava: formerly Brava, also operated by Brava Group, acquired together with Djazz TV by Stingray in 2015
 Television in the Netherlands
 Digital television in the Netherlands

References

External links
 www.djazz.tv

Television channels in the Netherlands
Television channels in Flanders
Television channels in Belgium
Television channels and stations established in 2012
Djazz